Kuritzkes is a surname. Notable people with the surname include:

Daniel Kuritzkes, American physician
Justin Kuritzkes, American playwright and novelist